Waleed Mahboob [وليد محبوب in Arabic] (born 21 December 1985) is a Saudi football player. He currently plays as a right-back .

References

External links 
 

1985 births
Living people
Saudi Arabian footballers
Al-Ahli Saudi FC players
Abha Club players
Al-Wehda Club (Mecca) players
Al-Ansar FC (Medina) players
Ettifaq FC players
Jeddah Club players
Al-Entesar Club players
Al-Ula FC players
Sportspeople from Jeddah
Saudi First Division League players
Saudi Professional League players
Saudi Second Division players
Saudi Third Division players
Association football fullbacks